Cocoa Beach (foaled September 28, 2004) is a notable Chilean-bred thoroughbred racehorse who was the 2008 Chilean Horse of the Year and won races in the United Arab Emirates, Chile, and the United States.

Background 
Cocoa Beach was bred by Haras La Obra, sired by Doneraile Court and out of the mare Visionera, half-sister to the dual Chilean G1 winner Poseida.

Racing Career

2007: Two-year-old season 
Cocoa Beach first raced in Chile as a two-year-old, trained by Sergio Inda in all but her last race and owned by Los Tilos. Her first race was an ungraded stakes race at Club Hípico de Santiago, which she won by four and a half lengths. She followed this up with three consecutive G3 wins at Hipódromo Chile, running as the favorite in every race  and winning the last two by 9 and 9 lengths respectively. These earned her the distinction of the 'Trébol de Plata', awarded to horses that win three consecutive races at Hipódromo Chile within one year. Cocoa Beach was named the 2007 Chilean Champion Two-Year-Old Filly.

2008: three-year-old season 
Cocoa Beach was sold to Godolphin and exported to the United Arab Emirates in late 2007, purchased by head of Godolphin Sheikh Mohammad Bin Rashid Al Maktoum as a gift for his then-wife Princess Haya bint Hussein. After finishing second to Fiesta Lady in her first race in the United Arab Emirates, Cocoa Beach won the UAE 1000 Guineas by 5 lengths, beating Fiesta Lady. Cocoa Beach also won the UAE Oaks in her last race under the name of HRH Princess Haya bint Hussein before finishing third in the G2 UAE Derby.

2008/2009: four-year-old season 
The rest of Cocoa Beach's racing career was spent in the United States, where she first raced in August of 2008 in her first race as a four-year-old, winning the Love Sign Stakes at Saratoga. Cocoa Beach then won the G1 Beldame Stakes at Belmont Park, running down favorite Ginger Punch to win by a half length. Her first defeat in the United States was in the G1 Breeders Cup Ladies Classic at Santa Anita Park, where she finished second to the unbeaten Zenyatta by one and a half lengths. In her final race of 2008, Cocoa Beach ran in the G1 Matriarch Stakes, her first race on turf since her debut. The field was considered strong, including the previous year's winner Precious Kitten and G1 winners Black Mamba and Magical Fantasy. Starting as the favorite, Cocoa Beach won the race by three-quarters of a length. After the win, she was given a break, with plans to return in May of 2009. The win earned her the title of Horse of the Meet for the Hollywood Park Autumn Meet.

Cocoa Beach was named the 2008 Chilean Horse of the Year and was rated at 119 (54 kilograms) in the World Thoroughbred Rankings for horses three-year-old and older.

An injury delayed Cocoa Beach's first 2009 race until June, when she finished fourth of four as the overwhelming favorite in the  Floral Park Heatherton Stakes, coming out of the race stiff.

2009: five-year-old season 
Officially turning five on August 1st, Cocoa Beach was entered in the G1 Go For Wand Handicap, but was scratched by trainer Saeed bin Suroor. Her five-year-old debut ended up instead being the ungraded De La Rose Stakes on the turf three days later, which she won by a neck. Coming out of the race well, Cocoa Beach next ran in the G2 Ballston Spa Handicap. She went off as the second choice and finished fourth after stalking a slow pace. Returning to Santa Anita Park for the G1 Lady's Secret Stakes and ridden by Richard Migliore for the first time, Cocoa Beach finished third to Zenyatta and Lethal Heat. Cocoa Beach trained well leading up to the G1 Breeders' Cup Ladies Classic, but weakened in the final stretch of the race to finish 6th.

Racing Statistics 

An asterisk after the odds means Cocoa Beach was the post time favorite.

Retirement and Broodmare Career 
After the 2009 Breeders' Cup Ladies Classic, Cocoa Beach was retired to join the Godolphin broodmare herd. She is the dam of Imperia, winner of the 2014 G3 Pilgrim Stakes, and the graded stakes placed mare Lido.

Pedigree

References

2004 racehorse births
Racehorses bred in Chile
Racehorses trained in Chile
Thoroughbred family 2-f